Billy Garrett Jr. (born October 16, 1994) is an American professional basketball player for Legia Warszawa of the Polish Basketball League. He played college basketball for DePaul.

High school career

Garrett's grandfather was Bill Garrett, the first African-American basketball player in the Big Ten. His father, Billy Garrett Sr., is a DePaul assistant coach. The younger Garrett attended Morgan Park High School. He committed to DePaul early in his high school career. Garrett achieved basketball success despite being diagnosed with sickle cell disease. When Wayne Blackshear graduated in 2011, Garrett became the focal point of the team as a junior. As a senior, he led the team to the 2013 IHSA 3A championship over Cahokia High School.

College career

In January 2014, he nearly died from a sickle cell crisis. Garrett managed to rebound from his attack and win conference rookie of the year honors. He averaged 12.4 points and 3.2 assists per game as a freshman. As a junior, he averaged 12.6 points, 3.5 assists, and 2.9 rebounds per game on a 9–22 team. "It has been disappointing for me," Garrett said. "I wanted to come in and help change the culture and bring a positive outlook on DePaul basketball citywide and nationwide." As a senior, he averaged 14.9 points per game while shooting 36 percent from three. He was Big East Scholar-Athlete of the year as a senior. Garrett finished his career as DePaul's all-time leader in made free throws.

Professional career

Westchester Knicks (2017–2019)
After going undrafted in the 2017 NBA Draft, Garrett did not play in the NBA Summer League. He joined the Westchester Knicks of the NBA G-League. Garrett increased his role on the team after Trey Burke was called up to the New York Knicks. Garrett averaged 11.9 points, 2.7 boards, 2.5 assists and 1.0 steals in 27.1 minutes per game. On October 4, 2018, he signed an Exhibit 10 deal with the New York Knicks.

New York Knicks (2019)
On April 2, 2019, the New York Knicks announced that they had signed Garrett to a 10-day contract. He became the first NBA player with sickle-cell disease. In four games, he averaged 6.5 points per game. In July 2019, Garrett joined the Phoenix Suns for the 2019 NBA Summer League.

Élan Chalon (2019)
On July 25, 2019, Garrett signed a deal with French club Élan Chalon.

Larisa (2020)
On January 2, 2020, Garrett officially signed with Greek club Larisa for the remainder of the season.

Garrett joined House of 'Paign, a team composed primarily of Illinois alumni in The Basketball Tournament 2020. He scored nine points in a 76–53 win over War Tampa in the first round.

Lakeland Magic (2021)
For the 2020–21 season, Garrett joined the Lakeland Magic of the G League where he averaged 11.7 points, 2.9 rebounds and 5.3 assists in 29.4 minutes en route to the NBA G League title.

Czarni Słupsk (2021–2022)
On July 22, 2021, Garrett signed with Czarni Słupsk of the Energa Basket Liga.

Riesen Ludwigsburg (2022)
On August 23, 2022, he has signed with Riesen Ludwigsburg of the Basketball Bundesliga.

Arka Gdynia (2022)
On November 10, 2022, he signed with Arka Gdynia of the Polish Basketball League.

Legia Warszawa (2022–present)
On December 2, 2022, he signed with Legia Warszawa of the Polish Basketball League.

Career statistics

NBA

Regular season

|-
| style="text-align:left;"| 
| style="text-align:left;"| New York
| 4 || 0 || 15.8 || .407 || .000 || 1.000 || .8 || 1.8 || .3 || .3 || 6.5
|- class="sortbottom"
| style="text-align:center;" colspan="2"| Career
| 4 || 0 || 15.8 || .407 || .000 || 1.000 || .8 || 1.8 || .3 || .3 || 6.5

References

External links
 DePaul Blue Demons bio

1994 births
Living people
American expatriate basketball people in France
American men's basketball players
Basketball players from Chicago
Czarni Słupsk players
DePaul Blue Demons men's basketball players
Élan Chalon players
Lakeland Magic players
Larisa B.C. players
Legia Warsaw (basketball) players
Morgan Park Academy alumni
New York Knicks players
People with sickle-cell disease
Shooting guards
Undrafted National Basketball Association players
Westchester Knicks players